John Ramon III Folch de Cardona i de Prades, (9 January 1418 – 1485), was a Catalan nobleman. John Ramon's titles included Count of Prades (4th), Count of Cardona, Viscount of Vilamur, Baron of Entença, Admiral of Aragon, Captain-general of Catalonia as well as Viceroy of Sicily from 1477 to 1479.

His parents were John Ramon II, 3rd Count of Cardona (14 June 14001471) and Joana de Prades, heiress of Prades and Entenza. John Ramon III became the sixth count of Prades and viscount of Vilamur upon the resignation of his father in 1445. Upon the death of his father in 1471, he inherited the County of Cardona.

Biography 
John Ramon III was ambassador to the pope for Alfonso V of Aragon and actively participated in the Cortes from 1449 to 1455.

Shortly before beginning of the Catalan Civil War, John Ramon joined King John II of Aragon's army and was made Captain-General. For his service he was awarded the Sicilian town of Alì Terme in 1463. After the Catalan war, John Ramon accompanied Ferran, Prince of Girona to the campaign of Roussillon. He went on to fight against French troops in the Ampurdan area at battle of Besós.

As Viceroy of Sicily (1477–79), John Ramon moved to Italy accompanied by the infanta Joana, where he repressed the revolt of Leonard de Alagon and Arborea in Sardinia.

In 1479, John Ramon returned to Catalonia and was the trusted advisor of the new king Ferdinand II of Aragon, whom he counseled for years. In 1484 the king entrusted him as Captain-general of the campaigns against the count of Pallars and against the serfs of Pere Joan Sala.

John Ramon III died in 1485.

Family 
In 1445, John Ramon III married the dowager countess of Foix, Joana de Urgell i Arago, daughter of James II, Count of Urgell  and his wife Isabel of Aragon. She was the widow of John I, Count of Foix.  
Their children were:
James of Cardona
Juan Ramón Folc IV de Cardona
Catalina de Cardona.

His second wife Elisabet de Cabrera, brought him the revenues of the viscounties of Cabrera and Bas when his father-in-law, Bernat Joan de Cabrera died in 1466. However, John Ramon III had to renounce these properties, to please King John II of Aragon, who divided these spoils between de Sarriera and de Armendaris to pay for their 1471 defection. As compensation, the king of Aragon made count John Ramon III one of the three tenants of the generalitet.

Joan Ramon Folc IV de Cardona 

Note: sometimes John Ramón Folc or John Ramón Folch

Joan Ramon (1446 - 29 January 1513 Arbeca - Lleida) was Admiral and grand constable of Catalonia and Aragón.  He married Aldonza Enríquez in 1467 and they had 14 children; among them:[see each for any further refs]

 Fernando Ramon Folch, 2nd Duke of Cardona (c. 1469 - 1543), and several other titles. 
 Antoni Folc de Cardona y Enriquez - Viceroy of Sardinia, 1534 - 1549
 Juana Cardona Y Enriquez (died 1547) - married 1503 to Antonio Manrique de Lara, 2nd Duke of Nájera
 Isabel de Cardona y Enríquez de Quiñones (1467 - 1513) - married in Arbeca, 1503, to Alonso Felipe de Aragón y Gurrea, II Duke of Luna

He was awarded the title Duke of Cardona (1st) in 1491 by King Ferdinand II of Aragón.

1418 births
1485 deaths
Counts of Spain
Viceroys of Sicily